The Philippine Scout mutiny was a mutiny by the Philippine Scouts of the Philippine Division which occurred in July 1924.

The Philippine Scouts were raised by the US Army during the Philippine American War (1899-1902). They served as auxiliaries to the United States units and assisted in various duties such as navigation and combat. In the early 1920s, these scouts began to function as American units. They made up the core of US military rule in the Philippines. However, they were not given the same benefits as their white counterparts. With growing discontent, a mutiny was staged on July 7, 1924, at Fort William McKinley, but was quickly quelled.

Many of the scouts who staged the mutiny were sentenced to lengthy prison terms. The US Army made no changes in the Scouts' pay, recruitment policies or leadership promotions. The indifference of authorities in refusing to acknowledge the disparities would mirror the long struggle for equal benefits of Filipino-American veterans who fought for the United States during World War II.

References
Meixsel, Richard B. "The Philippine Scout Mutiny of 1924." South East Asia Research 10, no.3 (November 2002): 333–359.

External links
Army History

Mutinies
Philippine–American War

de:Philippine Scouts#Meuterei 1924